Adrian Jevrić (born 7 July 1986 in Paderborn) is a German footballer who currently is a player-manager at Suryoye Paderborn.

Career
Jevrić began his career with youth academies of TuS Sennelager, Hövelhofer SV, and SC Paderborn. In 2004, he promoted to SC Paderborn 07's reserve team. He made his debut on 24 April 2010 against MSV Duisburg. On 31 May 2010, he signed his first professional contract for SC Paderborn 07.

Jevrić joined SV Suryoye Paderborn in the beginning of 2020. He also became the club head coach from the summer 2020.

References

1986 births
Living people
German footballers
SC Paderborn 07 players
2. Bundesliga players
Sportspeople from Paderborn
Association football midfielders
Footballers from North Rhine-Westphalia
SV Lippstadt 08 players